Joanne Simpson (formerly Joanne Malkus, born Joanne Gerould; March 23, 1923 – March 4, 2010) was the first woman in the United States to receive a Ph.D. in meteorology, which she received in 1949 from the University of Chicago. Simpson received both her undergraduate and graduate degrees from the University of Chicago, and did post-doctoral work at Dartmouth College. Simpson was a member of the National Academy of Engineering, and taught and researched meteorology at numerous universities as well as the federal government. Simpson contributed to many areas of the atmospheric sciences, particularly in the field of tropical meteorology. She has researched hot towers, hurricanes, the trade winds, air-sea interactions, and helped develop the Tropical Rainfall Measuring Mission (TRMM).

Academic life
Her teaching and research career at universities includes time at the University of Chicago, New York University, Illinois Institute of Technology, Woods Hole Oceanographic Institution, UCLA, the Environmental Satellite Services Administration (ESSA), the National Oceanic and Atmospheric Administration (NOAA), University of Virginia, and the National Aeronautics and Space Administration (NASA).

Research
In 1958 Malkus collaborated with Herbert Riehl and calculated the average moist static energy and how it varied vertically throughout the atmosphere. They noted that at altitudes up to approximately 750 hPa the moist static energy decreased with height. Above 750 hPa, the moist static energy increased with height which had neither been observed or explained before. Riehl and Malkus realized that this must be due to moist convection that started near the surface that continued rising relatively adiabatically to near . They called these clouds "undiluted chimneys" but they would later be commonly referred to as hot towers. They estimated that it would take less than 5,000 of these towers daily throughout the tropics to result in the moist static energy profile they observed.

By 1966 she became the director of Project Stormfury while chief of the Experimental Meteorology Branch of the Environment Satellite Services Administration's Institute for Atmospheric Sciences. She eventually became NASA's lead weather researcher and authored or co-authored over 190 articles.

Awards
1954 Received the Guggenheim Fellowship
1962 Melsinger Award from the American Meteorological Society (AMS)
1963 Selected by the Los Angeles Times as "Woman of the Year" in Science. 
1967 Won a Department of Commerce Silver Medal for her work with the Experimental Meteorology Branch.
1968 Elected a fellow of the AMS. 
1983 Recipient of the AMS's Carl-Gustaf Rossby Research Medal, its highest honor, for "outstanding contributions to man's understanding of the structure of the atmosphere."
2002 Awarded the prestigious International Meteorological Organization Prize from the World Meteorological Organization.
2021 American Meteorological Society established the Joanne Simpson Tropical Meteorology Research Award granted to researchers who make outstanding contributions to advancing the understanding of the physics and dynamics of the tropical atmosphere. The inaugural recipient was Kerry H. Cook.

Personal
She is quoted as saying winning the Rossby Medal in 1983 made her feel "it isn't really so ridiculous that I did all of this. I'm not really a freak; I am a member of the community."

Yet, poignantly, in an article published in the Annals of the New York Academy of Sciences, she was quoted as saying "I am not convinced that either the position, rewards or achievements have been worth the cost. My personal and married life and child raising have surely suffered from the professional attainments I have achieved."

Her brother Daniel C. Gerould was the Lucille Lortel Distinguished Professor of Theatre and Comparative Literature at the Graduate Center, City University of New York and Director of Publications of the Martin E. Segal Theatre Center. Her husband was hurricane expert Robert Simpson. Her former husband Willem Van Rensselaer Malkus (1923-2016) was a professor of applied mathematics at MIT.

Simpson died March 4, 2010, in Washington D.C., surrounded by her family.

References

Further reading 
 Simpson's private citizen statement
 Simpson's NASA biography

Breaking Through the Clouds: The Sometimes Turbulent Life of Meteorologist Joanne Simpson, Sandra Nickel and Helena Perez Garcia, New York: Henry N. Abrams (2022).
 Article by Simpson on global warming issues
 Grand Times article on Simpson
 Another NASA biography
 Keeping her head in the clouds USA Today 04/13/00
 Joanne Simpson, 1923-2010. NASA Earth Observatory Image of the Day March 9, 2010.
 Obituary: Joanne Simpson (1923–2010), Nature News, by Robert A. Houze, Jr
 Obituary: Joanne Malkus Simpson, 86, Washington Post, Monday, March 8, 2010
 Papers of Joanne Simpson, 1890-2010. Schlesinger Library, Radcliffe Institute, Harvard University.
 

1923 births
2010 deaths
American meteorologists
University of Chicago alumni
University of Chicago faculty
Carl-Gustaf Rossby Research Medal recipients
Women meteorologists
20th-century American women scientists
20th-century American scientists
American women academics
21st-century American women